Kurzban is a surname. Notable people with the surname include:

Ira J. Kurzban (born 1949), American civil rights and immigration lawyer
Robert Kurzban (born 1969), American writer and psychologist

See also
Kurban (disambiguation)